Sokhatino is a rural locality (a selo) in Praktichansky Selsoviet of Mazanovsky District, Amur Oblast, Russia. The population was 75 as of 2018. There are 3 streets.

Geography 
Sokhatino is located on the right bank of the Zeya River, 104 km northwest of Novokiyevsky Uval (the district's administrative centre) by road. Novokiyevka is the nearest rural locality.

References 

Rural localities in Mazanovsky District